Woodville in Winfield, Georgia is a building from 1814. It was listed on the National Register of Historic Places in 1979.

It is one of a few surviving plantation-style old homes in Columbia County.

References

Houses on the National Register of Historic Places in Georgia (U.S. state)
Houses completed in 1814
Houses in Columbia County, Georgia
National Register of Historic Places in Columbia County, Georgia
Plantations in Georgia (U.S. state)